Copelatus apuzzoi is a species of diving beetle. It is part of the genus Copelatus of the subfamily Copelatinae in the family Dytiscidae. It was described by Bilardo & Rocchi in 1999.

References

apuzzoi
Beetles described in 1999